Senator Whiting may refer to:

Fred Whiting (born 1938), South Dakota State Senate
Justin Rice Whiting (1847–1903), Michigan State Senate
Lorenzo D. Whiting (1819–1889), Illinois State Senate
William Whiting II (1841–1911), Massachusetts State Senate